Schoettle is a surname. Notable people with the surname include:

 Andy Schoettle (1933–2010), American sailor
 Anne Schoettle (born 1959), American television soap opera writer
 Michael Schoettle (born 1936), American sailor
  (born 1976), German politician

See also
 Schoettler